Pedro Mendes may refer to:

Footballers 
Pedro Mendes (footballer, born 1979), Portuguese retired midfielder born Pedro Miguel da Silva Mendes
Pedro Mendes (footballer, born April 1990), Portuguese winger Pedro Miguel Alves Mendes
Pedro Mendes (footballer, born May 1990), Brazilian forward born Pedro Ferreira-Mendes
Pedro Mendes (footballer, born October 1990), Portuguese defender born Pedro Filipe Teodósio Mendes
Pedro Mendes (footballer, born 1993), Portuguese midfielder born Pedro Rafael Amado Mendes
Pedro Mendes (footballer, born 1999), Portuguese forward born Pedro Manuel Lobo Peixoto Mineiro Mendes

Other
Pedro Pedrosa Mendes, Portuguese computer scientist and professor
Pedro Mendes (model) (born 1987), Swiss model and winner of Mister International 2015